Natalie S. Murdock is an American politician and a Democratic member of the North Carolina Senate. Upon being sworn in, she became the first black woman under the age of 40 to serve in the NC Senate.

Early life
Murdock was born and raised in Greensboro, North Carolina, to Christine and Harold Murdock, a veteran and social worker who inspired her to pursue a career in politics. 

While attending James B. Dudley High School, she served as a Girl Scout, debate team member, and often attended NAACP meetings with her father. After graduating, she completed her Bachelor of Arts degree in Political Science and Communication Studies from the University of North Carolina at Chapel Hill and completed graduate work at Western Carolina University and Pfeiffer University.

Career
Upon completing her education, Murdock was appointed the North Carolina Department of Justice's Deputy Director of Communications and principle and chief strategist for Murdock Anderson Consulting. She ran in the 2020 North Carolina state Senate primary to replace resigning member Mickey Michaux. Upon being sworn in on April 2, 2020, she became the first black woman under the age of 40 to serve in the NC Senate.

References

External links

Living people
Democratic Party North Carolina state senators
Women state legislators in North Carolina
21st-century American politicians
21st-century American women politicians
African-American state legislators in North Carolina
University of North Carolina at Chapel Hill alumni
African-American women in politics
Politicians from Greensboro, North Carolina
Year of birth missing (living people)
21st-century African-American women
21st-century African-American politicians